Kenneth W. MacDonald (born 21 February 1959) is a Scottish businessman, best known for his work within the Scottish tartan industry as owner of Houston Traditional Kiltmakers, Paisley.  He currently serves as a Vice Chairman of the Scottish Tartans Authority and Deacon of the Incorporation of Weavers of Glasgow.

Early life

Ken MacDonald was born on 21 February 1959 in Paisley to Hugh Lawson MacDonald and Eileen Douglas MacDonald (née Houston). MacDonald was educated at Dardenne Preparatory School, Kilmacolm and then Keil School, Dumbarton before, at the age of 16, joining the family business Wm  Houston  Gentlemen’s Outfitters now known as Houston Traditional Kiltmakers in Paisley, Scotland. Houston Kiltmakers are world-renowned as a leading authority of all Scottish highland wear and etiquette.

Business career
W M Houston Gentlemen’s Outfitters was founded in 1909 by Mr William Houston of Paisley, the grandfather of Ken. The business was originally purchased by the Houston family in 1924 with only 2 shillings and sixpence in the till. The Shop operated for over 50 years as a traditional gentlemen’s outfitter, providing gentlemen of the day with pinstripe suits and bowler hats. Since then, the Houston and then MacDonald families have evolved and grown the business in Paisley, where the business is located.

After entering the family business, in 1975, MacDonald built up its reputation as a leading retailer of quality menswear. In 1986 he became Scottish Chairman of the Menswear Association of Britain, In 1988 he was responsible for designing the Glasgow Garden Festival staff uniform and retailed on the festival site. MacDonald later incorporated the uniform colours of grey, yellow and red into the Glasgow's Miles Better tartan. Kilts in this tartan were made for Prince William and Prince Harry and presented by him to Charles, Prince of Wales.

Other noted tartans designed by MacDonald include the Bute Heather tartan collection which was registered with the Scottish Register of Tartans in 2004. The range includes the variations on Bute Heather colours, all woven on the Isle of Bute.

MacDonald famously designed the American National Tartan which was presented to George W. Bush from the people of Scotland to the people of America to commemorate Tartan day.

Aside from his role in the highland wear industry, MacDonald is a Director of Paisley First (Business Improvement District), and past member of the Paisley Vision Board whose remit was to lead the regeneration of Paisley town centre. He is serving his second term as Deacon of the Incorporation of Weavers Glasgow, a role which he took up in November 2014

Today Ken MacDonald runs the business, the 3rd generation of the MacDonald family to operate the business. Houston’s handmade kilts are all produced in Scotland and shipped around the world to the USA, Japan, Indian and Australia as well as servicing the domestic market in Scotland, the UK and Europe. 
 
Ken is a leading authority on Highlandwear, tartans and tailoring. He has over 40 years of experience working directly with all the main Scottish tartan mills, sporran suppliers and many other expert manufactures. His knowledge in the industry is unparalleledand many hold Ken as one of the leading authorities. Ken is also Vice Chairman of the Scottish Tartan Authority which advises all aspects of tartan and retailers worldwide. The STA's main aims is to implement an international tartan centre and to introduce a quality/authenticity mark on all Scottish Woven Tartans in order to preserve, promote and protect Scottish tartans for future generations. He has also held posts as Deacon of the Incorporation of Glasgow Weavers and on the board for Paisley BIDs.  
Ken MacDonald is a Rotarian and also supports The University of Paisley, providing students with the opportunity to gain work experience prior to leaving university. As well as taking on university graduates on internship programmes.  He is passionate about Scotland and especially the town of Paisley where his family business has been for over 100 years. Ken also likes to spend time on the Island of Bute where he gets inspiration for the new tartans he designs.

References 

1959 births
Living people
Businesspeople from Paisley, Renfrewshire
People educated at Keil School